Mann Made is the second British and fourth American studio album by Manfred Mann, released in October 1965 on His Master's Voice in the United Kingdom, and November 1965 on Ascot Records in the United States. It was the group's final recording project with original members Mike Vickers and Paul Jones, as well as their last to be recorded at Abbey Road Studios, London, England, before switching to Fontana Records.

The album was reduced to twelve songs by Capitol Records in the Canadian market, where "You're for Me", "I Really Do Believe", and "Hi Lili, Hi Lo" were excluded, and replaced by "She Needs Company" along with the hit single "Pretty Flamingo" for the June 1966 release.

Track listing

Original UK/US release

Original Canadian release

Recording sessions
All of the songs were recorded 11 January–10 June 1965, at Abbey Road Studios, London, England, except 4 February and 18 March 1966 for "She Needs Company" and "Pretty Flamingo", respectively:

"I'll Make It Up to You" – 11 January 1965
"Look Away" – 15 January 1965
"Bare Hugg" – 4 March 1965
"L.S.D." – 16 March 1965
"The Way You Do the Things You Do", "The Abominable Snowmann", "Watch Your Step", "Stormy Monday Blues" – 6 April 1965
"I Really Do Believe", "You Don't Know Me" – 8 April 1965
"Since I Don't Have You" – 18 May 1965
"You're for Me" – 24 May 1965
"You Don't Know Me", "Hi-Lili, Hi-Lo" – 10 June 1965

Personnel
Manfred Mann
 Manfred Mann – Hammond organ, keyboards, backing vocals
 Paul Jones – lead vocals, harmonica
 Mike Vickers – guitars, saxes, flutes, backing vocals
 Tom McGuinness – bass, backing vocals, liner notes, guitar on "Pretty Flamingo"
 Mike Hugg – drums, percussion, vibes
 Jack Bruce – bass and backing vocals on "She Needs Company" and "Pretty Flamingo"

Production and additional personnel
 John Burgess – producer, mixing
 Henry Lowther – trumpet on "She Needs Company"
 Lyn Dobson – saxophone on "She Needs Company", flute solo on "Pretty Flamingo"
 Norman Smith – engineer, mixing
 Nicholas Wright – photography

Release history

References

See also 
 Manfred Mann discography

1965 albums
Manfred Mann albums
His Master's Voice albums
United Artists Records albums